Nacif Beyaoui (born 10 November 1977) is a Tunisian football manager who is currently in charge of Bahraini club Al-Muharraq.

Honours
Hajer 
First Division: 2013–14

References

1977 births
Living people
Tunisian football managers
Hajer Club managers
Al-Khor SC managers
Al Kharaitiyat SC managers
Al-Muharraq SC managers
Al-Qadisiyah FC managers
Club Athlétique Bizertin managers
Stade Tunisien managers
Fujairah FC managers
Al-Shoulla FC managers
Tunisian expatriate football managers
Expatriate football managers in Saudi Arabia
Tunisian expatriate sportspeople in Saudi Arabia
Expatriate football managers in Qatar
Tunisian expatriate sportspeople in Qatar
Expatriate football managers in Bahrain
Tunisian expatriate sportspeople in Bahrain
Expatriate football managers in the United Arab Emirates
Tunisian expatriate sportspeople in the United Arab Emirates
Saudi Professional League managers
Saudi First Division League managers
Qatar Stars League managers
Bahraini Premier League managers
UAE Pro League managers
Tunisian Ligue Professionnelle 1 managers